Littledown and Iford is a ward in Bournemouth, Dorset. Since 2019, the ward has elected 2 councillors to Bournemouth, Christchurch and Poole Council.

History 
The ward formerly elected councillors to Bournemouth Borough Council before it was abolished in 2019.

Geography 
The ward covers the suburbs of Littledown and Iford. The ward is home to the Royal Bournemouth Hospital and Kings Park.

Election results

2019

2012 
A by-election was held in 2012.

References 

Wards of Bournemouth, Christchurch and Poole